Orson Alonzo Kinney (December 12, 1894 – January 4, 1966) was an American basketball player and coach known for his collegiate playing career at Yale University in the 1910s. He led the Bulldogs to two Eastern Intercollegiate Basketball League (EIBL) championships in 1914–15 and 1916–17 and led the league in scoring in 1915–16 and 1916–17. As a junior in 1916–17 Kinney was named an All-American by the Helms Athletic Foundation. Orson Kinney was also the younger brother of Gilmore Kinney, another Yale basketball star who was the collegiate national player of the year in 1906–07.

Kinney became the head coach of two programs following graduation – Fordham University and Yale University. While coaching Fordham he also played the Crescent Athletic Club.

Head coaching record

References

1894 births
1966 deaths
All-American college men's basketball players
American men's basketball players
Basketball coaches from New York (state)
Basketball players from New York (state)
Fordham Rams men's basketball coaches
Forwards (basketball)
Yale Bulldogs baseball players
Yale Bulldogs men's basketball coaches
Yale Bulldogs men's basketball players